S.O.S me estoy enamorando (English: S.O.S I'm Falling In Love) is a Mexican telenovela that aired on Las Estrellas from 6 September 2021 to 16 January 2022. The series is produced by Lucero Suárez. It is an adaptation of the Argentine telenovela El sodero de mi vida, and stars Irán Castillo and Daniel Arenas. Production began on 31 May 2021.

Plot 
Alberto Muñoz (Daniel Arenas) must save the print shop that his family has had for several generations and must reach an agreement with his "new" partners. The deal, which seemed favorable, soon falls apart because the partners have other plans for the land where the shop sits on. Things get complicated when Alberto falls in love with Sofía (Irán Castillo), the daughter of one of the partners. The bond between them is deep, but they must overcome many obstacles to be happy.

Cast 
 Irán Castillo as Sofía Fernández
 Daniel Arenas as Alberto Muñoz Cano
 César Évora as Leopoldo Fernández
 Nuria Bages as Delia Muñoz Cano
 Marcelo Córdoba as Omar Kattan
 Ana Patricia Rojo as Inés Paredes Nava
 Yolanda Ventura as Elsa Fernández
 Juan Martín Jauregui as Diego Miranda
 Lourdes Reyes as Leonor Muñoz Cano
 Norma Lazareno as Eugenia Campoamor
 Alejandro Ibarra as Orlando Maqueto
 Óscar Bonfiglio as Miguel Escobedo
 Luz Edith Rojas as Fabiana
 Pierre Angelo as Raúl Peralta
 Pierre Louis as Daniel Soto
 Dari Romo as Romina Muñoz Cano
 Jorge Trejo Reyes as Nicolás Lozano
 Adriana Montes de Oca as Titi
 Candela Márquez as Mónica Muñoz Cano
 Rocío de Santiago as Cecilia
 Victoria Viera as Ana Fernández
 Manolo Bonfiglio as Chucho
 Pedro Prieto as Gotcha
 Siouzana Melikián as Laura Díaz
 Magda Karina as Martha
 José Carlos Femat as Sergio
 Leonardo Herrera as Federico "Fede" Miranda Fernández
 Jorge Salinas as Vicente Ramos

Recurring 
 Tamara Vallarta as María
 Montserrat Marañón as Zulma
 Carlos Bracho as Estanislao
 Olivia Collins as Mima
 Herson Andrade as Luisito
 Ricardo Kleinbaum as Mario Trejo
 Sachi Tamashiro as Verónica
 Queta Lavat as Caridad
 Mauricio Abularach as Manolo
 Vanessa Acosta as Andrea
 Maya Ricote as Erika

Ratings 
 
}}

Episodes

Notes

References

External links 
 

2021 telenovelas
2021 Mexican television series debuts
2022 Mexican television series endings
2020s Mexican television series
Televisa telenovelas
Mexican telenovelas
Spanish-language telenovelas
Mexican television series based on Argentine television series